Great Western Railway 7800 Class No. 7821 Ditcheat Manor is a preserved British steam locomotive.

The second of the last batch of 10 engines of the thirty-strong class, 7821 was actually built by British Railways in 1950. Like most of the class of lightweight 4-6-0s, it was allocated to lines in Mid Wales, but was also based Oxley and Newton Abbot. 7821 was withdrawn in November 1965 and was sent to Woodham Brothers scrapyard in Barry, Vale of Glamorgan, South Wales.

Rescued from Barry in 1980, it was sent to the embryonic Gloucestershire Warwickshire Railway, before moving to the Llangollen Railway and then Swindon, restoration being completed in 1998, when it first steamed at the West Somerset Railway. The loco then worked on the Great Central Railway in Leicestershire, but in late 2005 moved to the Cambrian Railways Trust. 7821 moved again in 2005 to the Churnet Valley Railway where it served its last months of its boiler ticket in traffic.

In 2007, the West Somerset Railway Association bought 7821 from its private owner, in part funded by reselling GWR 0-6-0PT No. 6412 to its original owner, the South Devon Railway. In light of a mechanical examination showing that the locomotive needed extensive and expensive chassis and boiler work, whilst funding is raised for its overhaul the WSRA agreed a static display contract with the Museum of the Great Western Railway, Swindon for a minimum contract period of five years. The locomotive was subsequently relocated to the museum by road on 14 November 2010, where it presently resides and is due to stay until November 2020. On 21 August 2018, the locomotive was relocated to the nearby Swindon Designer Outlet in place of classmate No. 7819 Hinton Manor.

Allocations

References

External links 
 West Somerset Railway Association
 West Somerset Railway (unofficial fan page)
 Great Central Railway: 7821

7821
Railway locomotives introduced in 1950
7821
Locomotives saved from Woodham Brothers scrapyard
Standard gauge steam locomotives of Great Britain